Lorenzo Pasqualini (born 19 August 1989) is an Italian footballer who plays for SSD Porto D'Ascoli.

Biography

Ascoli 
Born in Ascoli Piceno, Marche, Pasqualini started his career at hometown club Ascoli Calcio 1898. He was the member of Allievi U17 team in 2004–05 season. Pasqualini was promoted to the reserve in 2005–06 season; he also received his first senior call-up in May 2006, for the last match of 2005–06 Serie A. He did not made any debut and remained in the reserve for the next  seasons in Campionato Nazionale Primavera.

In January 2009 he graduated from the reserve and left for Serie D club Brindisi in temporary deal. Brindisi promoted back to fully professional league in June 2009 and the club also signed Pasqualini in co-ownership deal.

Pasqualini made 27 league appearances for Brindisi in 2009–10 Lega Pro Seconda Divisione. Both club failed to agree a price for the remain 50% registration rights, thus both clubs submitted their price to Lega Calcio in order to decide the ownership. Eventually Ascoli outbid the fourth division club.

Pasqualini was confirmed as a first-team member in 2010–11 Serie B and chose no.20 shirt. However, he only played twice in 2010–11 season before left for Siracusa in new temporary deal with pre-set price. Siracusa did not excise the option.

In the new season Pasqualini changed to wear no.21 shirt. (Alex Pederzoli changed from 21 to 4) Pasqualini also got more chance to play with 26 appearances in 2011–12 Serie B. Pasqualini was offered a new 3-year contract on 6 June 2012.

Parma
Due to ongoing financial difficulties Pasqualini was sold to Serie A club Parma F.C. in late June 2012 in co-ownership deal, few days before the closure of financial year on 30 June 2012, for €1.25 million in 5-year contract. However Ascoli only received €150,000 cash and Davide Colomba also in co-ownership deal. Pasqualini immediately returned to Ascoli for another season.

Pasqualini played 39 games (including 35 starts) out of possible 42 games in 2012–13 Serie B. He missed once due to suspension for his 4th caution of the season (yellow card). Ascoli relegated at the end of the season.

In summer 2013 Pasqualini was signed by F.C. Crotone in a temporary deal for free. On 31 January 2014 the loan was terminated. On the same day he was signed by Salernitana in a temporary deal. In June 2014 Parma acquired Pasqualini outright from Ascoli for free.

In August 2014 he was signed by Slovenian club ND Gorica from Parma.

Savona
After the bankruptcy of Parma, Pasqualini was signed by Savona F.B.C. for -year contract.

References

External links
AIC profile (data by football.it) 

1989 births
Living people
People from Ascoli Piceno
Italian footballers
Association football fullbacks
Serie B players
Serie C players
Serie D players
Slovenian PrvaLiga players
Ascoli Calcio 1898 F.C. players
S.S.D. Città di Brindisi players
U.S. Siracusa players
F.C. Crotone players
U.S. Salernitana 1919 players
ND Gorica players
Savona F.B.C. players
U.S. Massese 1919 players
S.S.D. Jesina Calcio players
Italian expatriate footballers
Italian expatriate sportspeople in Slovenia
 Expatriate footballers in Slovenia
Sportspeople from the Province of Ascoli Piceno
Footballers from Marche